This is a list of series stories appearing in British comic 2000AD.

As an anthology comic magazine which has been published since 1977, 2000AD has featured both long running titles (like Judge Dredd and ABC Warriors) as well as dozens of shorter series and one-offs. In addition, features like Tharg's Future Shocks allowed the publication of single stories by any writers and still act as a training ground for aspiring writers, being the place both Alan Moore and Grant Morrison started in the comic. (In addition, 2000 AD absorbed two of its sister titles, Tornado and Starlord.)

A complete index of stories published in 2000 AD from February 1977 to December 2019 (#1 to #2162) is here (.pdf file) (WikiCommons).

Stories

0–9
 The 86ers

A
ABC Warriors
 Abelard Snazz
 Absalom
 Ace Trucking Co.
 Age of the Wolf
 Agent Rat
 A.H.A.B.
 The Alienist
 Al's Baby
 American Gothic
 Ampney Crucis Investigates
 Anderson: PSI Division
 Angel
 Angel Zero
 Ant Wars
 Apocalypse Soon
 Armitage
 Armageddon: The Bad Man
 Armoured Gideon
 Asylum
 Atavar

B
 Babe Race 2000
 Bad City Blue
 Bad Company
 Badlands
 The Ballad of Halo Jones
 The Balls Brothers
 Banzai Battalion
 Batman/Judge Dredd: Judgement on Gotham
 Bec & Kawl
 The Bendatti Vendetta
 Big Dave
 Bison
 Bix Barton
 Black Atlantic
 Black Light
 Black Siddha
 Blackhawk
 Black Shuck
 BLAIR One
 Blood of Satanus
 Bob Byrne's Twisted Tales
 The Bogie Man
 Bones of Eden
 Bonjo from Beyond the Stars
 Bradley
 Brass Sun
 Breathing Space
 Brit-Cit Babes
 Brigand Doom
 Brink
 Button Man

C
 Caballistics, Inc.
 Canon Fodder
 Captain Klep
 Carver Hale
 Chiaroscuro
 Chopper
 Chronos Carnival
 Citi-Def
 The Clown
 Colony Earth
 The Corps
 Counterfeit Girl
 Cradlegrave
 Cursed Earth Koburn
 Tor Cyan

D
 D.R. and Quinch
 Damnation Station
 Dan Dare
 Dandridge
 Danzig's Inferno

 Darkness Visible
 Dash Decent
 The Dead
 Dead Eyes
 Deadlock
 The Dead Man
 Dead Meat
 Dead Men Walking
 Dead Signal
 Death Planet
 Defoe
 Detonator X
 Dinosty
 Disaster 1990
 Downlode Tales
 Droid Life
 Dry Run
 Durham Red

F
 Family
 Feral and Foe
 Fervant and Lobe
 Fiends of the Eastern Front
 Finn
 Firekind
 Flesh
 Freaks
 Friday
 From Grace
 Future Shocks

G
 Glimmer Rats
 Go-Machine
 Grey Area
 Greysuit
 The Grudge Father

H
 Harmony
 Hap Hazzard
 Harke & Burr
 Harlem Heroes
 Harry Kipling (Deceased)
 Harry Twenty on the High Rock
 Helium
 The Helltrekkers
 Hershey & Steel
 Hewligan's Haircut
 Holocaust 12
 Hunted

I
 Ichabod Azrael
 Indigo Prime
 The Inspectre
 Insurrection
 Interceptor
 Invasion
 I Was a Teenage Tax Consultant

J
 Jack Point: Simping Detective
 Jaegir
 Janus: Psi Division
 A Joe Black Adventure 
 Johnny Woo
 The Journal of Luke Kirby
 Judge Death
 Judge Dredd
 Judge Hershey
 Judge Karyn
 Juliet November
 Junker

K
 Kelly
 Kid Cyborg
 Killer
 Kingdom
 Kola Kommandos

L
 Lazarus Churchyard
 Leatherjack
 Lenny Zero
 Leviathan
 A Life Less Ordinary
 Lobster Random
 London Falling
 A Love Like Blood
 Low Life

M
 M.A.C.H. 1
 Maelstrom
 Malone
 Mambo
 Maniac 5
 Marauder
 Mazeworld
 The Mean Arena
 Mean Team
 Medivac 318
 Meet Darren Dead
 Meltdown Man
 Mercy Heights
 Metalzoic
 Middenface McNulty
 The Mind of Wolfie Smith
 Missionary Man
 Moon Runners
 Mother Earth

N
 Necronauts
 Necrophim
 Nemesis & Deadlock
 Nemesis the Warlock
 Night Zero
 Nikolai Dante

O
 One-Off
 The Order
 Orlok, Agent of East-Meg One
 Outlaw
 Outlier

P
 Pandora
 Past Imperfect
 Project Overkill
 Pulp Sci-fi
 Purgatory
 Pussyfoot 5

R
 R.A.M. Raiders
 Rain Dogs
 Really & Truly
 Red Fang
 Red Razors
 The Red Seas
 Return to Armageddon
 Revere
 Rick Random
 Ro-Busters
 Ro-Jaws' Robo-Tales
 Roadkill
 Robo-Hunter
 Rogue Trooper
 Rose O'Rion

S
 Samantha Slade
 Samizdat Squad
 Sancho Panzer
 Satanus
 Savage
 The Scarlet Apocrypha
 Scarlet Traces
 The Scrap
 Second City Blues
 Shadows
 Shakara
 Shako!
 Shaun of the Dead
 Shimura
 Silo
 Sinister Dexter
 Skizz
 Sláine
 Slaughterbowl
 Sleaze 'n' Ryder
 Snow/Tiger
 Sooner or Later
 Soul Gun Warrior
 Soul Sisters
 The Spacegirls
 The Stainless Steel Rat
 Stalag #666
 Stickleback
 Stone Island
 Storming Heaven
 The Straitjacket Fits
 Strange Cases
 Strontium Dog
 Strontium Dogs
 Survival Geeks
 Synnamon

T
 Tainted
 Tales of Telguuth
 Tales from Beyond Science
 Tales from the Black Museum
 Tales from the Doghouse
 Tales from Mega-City One
 Tao De Moto
 Tempest
 Tharg the Mighty
 Tharg's 3rillers
 Tharg's Alien Invasions
 Tharg's Dragon Tales
 Tharg's Terror Tales
 The Ten-Seconders
 Thirteen
 Thistlebone
 Tiger Sun, Dragon Moon
 Time Flies
 Timehouse
 Timequake
 Time Twisters
 Torquemada
 Tracer
 Trash
 Tribal Memories
 Tyranny Rex

U
 Ulysses Sweet
 Universal Soldier
 Urban Strike

V
 Valkyries
 Vanguard
 The V.C.s
 Vector 13
 Venus Bluegenes
 The Visible Man
 The Vort

W
 Walter the Wobot
 Wardog
 What If...?
 Whatever Happened To?
 Wireheads
 Witch World

X
 XTNCT

Y
 Young Middenface

Z
 The Zaucer of Zilk
 Zenith
 Zippy Couriers
 Zombo

See also
 List of minor 2000 AD stories

External links
 Thrill Zone at 2000 AD online
 Touched by the Hand of Tharg
 

Lists of comics by title